This is a list of container ships with a capacity larger than 20,000 twenty-foot equivalent units (TEU).

Container ships have been built in increasingly larger sizes to take advantage of economies of scale and reduce expense as part of intermodal freight transport. Container ships are also subject to certain limitations in size. Primarily, these are the availability of sufficiently large main engines and the availability of a sufficient number of ports and terminals prepared and equipped to handle ultra-large container ships. Furthermore, some of the world's main waterways such as the Suez Canal and Singapore Strait restrict the maximum dimensions of a ship that can pass through them.

In 2016, Prokopowicz and Berg-Andreassen defined a container ship with a capacity of 10,000 to 20,000 TEU as a Very Large Container Ship (VLCS), and one with a capacity greater than 20,000 TEU as an Ultra Large Container Ship (ULCS).

As of June 2022, the record for the largest container ship is held by the Ever Alot built by CSSC, with a capacity of 24,004 TEU.

As of August 2021, the record for most containers loaded onto a single ship is held by the Ever Ace, which carried a total of 21,710 TEU of containers from Yantian to Europe.

Completed ships

Ships on order

Container loading records

See also
 List of largest container shipping companies
 List of largest cruise ships
List of largest ships by gross tonnage
 List of longest ships

References

 
Container ships
Container ships
Container ships
Container ships